Exit Wounds is the eighth studio album by Swedish metal band The Haunted, released on 25 August 2014. The album marks a return to their more heavy and aggressive sound after the alternative metal-influenced previous album Unseen. It is the first album released since former members Marco Aro (vocals) and Adrian Erlandsson (drums) rejoined the band and the first studio album to feature Ola Englund on guitar.

Reception
The album received a positive review from Chuck Loesch of Metal Injection.

Al Kikuras of AngryMetalGuy.com described it as a "fine return to form" giving the album 4.5 out of 5.0.

Jonathan Barkan of BloodyDisgusting.com also gave the album a positive review, ending with "Exit Wounds is the album that discouraged fans of The Haunted have been waiting and yearning for."

Track listing

Personnel
The Haunted
 Jonas Björler – bass
 Adrian Erlandsson – drums
 Patrik Jensen – guitar
 Marco Aro – vocals
 Ola Englund – guitar

References

2014 albums
The Haunted (Swedish band) albums
Century Media Records albums